The Rowett Institute is a research centre for studies into food and nutrition, located in Aberdeen, Scotland.

History
The institute was founded in 1913 when the University of Aberdeen and the North of Scotland College of Agriculture agreed that an "Institute for Research into Animal Nutrition" should be established in Scotland. The first director was John Boyd Orr, later to become Lord Boyd Orr, who moved from Glasgow to "the wilds of Aberdeenshire" in 1914. Orr drew up some plans for a nutrition research institute. Orr also donated £5000 for the building of a granite laboratory building at Craibstone, not far from the Bucksburn site of the Rowett.

At the breakout of the Great War, Orr left the institute, but returned in 1919 with a staff of four to begin work in the new laboratory. Orr continued to push for a new research institute and finally the Government agreed to pay half the costs but stipulated that the other half was to be found from other sources. The extra money was donated by Dr John Quiller Rowett, a businessman and director of a wine and spirits merchants in London.

Rowett's donation allowed the purchase of 41 acres of land for the institute to be built on. Rowett also contributed £10,000 towards the cost of the buildings. The money was donated with one very important stipulation from Rowett—"if any work done at the institute on animal nutrition were found to have a bearing on human nutrition, the institute would be allowed to follow up this work." The institute was formally opened in 1922 by Queen Mary.

In 1927, the Rowett was given £5000 to carry out an investigation to test whether health could be improved by the consumption of milk. After some further tests on other groups, a bill was passed in the House of Commons enabling local authorities in Scotland to provide cheap or free milk to all school children.  It was soon applied in England too. This helped reduce the surplus of milk at the time and also helped rescue the milk industry which was in danger of collapsing.

In 1936 Orr published Food, Health and Income, showing that the cost of a diet fulfilling basic nutritional requirements was beyond the means of half the British population and that 10 percent of the population was undernourished.
Following on from this first study, the Carnegie survey (supported by the Carnegie UK Trust) began in 1937 and surveyed nearly 8000 people in 16 locations, the largest study attempted in the UK relating diet and health.

War broke out just after the study was completed in 1939, but the results of the Carnegie survey were crucial to help implement a wartime food policy.

On 1 July 2008 the institute merged with the University of Aberdeen to become the Rowett Institute of Nutrition and Health, College of Life Sciences and Medicine.

In March 2016 the Rowett Institute relocated to a purpose-built building at the university's Medical School campus at Foresterhill, Aberdeen. The building won both Project of the Year, and Public Realm / Landscape in the 2017 annual design awards by the Aberdeen Society of Architects.

Notable alumni 

 Ainsley Iggo, known for demonstrating electrical recording from individual C fibres in the human body. President of the International Association for the Study of Pain (IASP) (1981–84).
 Peter Joseph Heald, known for his research on reproductive biochemistry.
 Winifred Margaret Dean, prolific translator of German scientific texts into English.

Staff

A. T. Phillipson Head of Physiology 1947 to 1963 and Depute Director from 1952.
John Boyd Orr, Director from 1914 to 1945, recipient of A Nobel Peace Prize for his research into nutrition and work as first Director-General of the United Nations Food and Agriculture Organization.
David Cutbertson, world leading authority on metabolism. Director from 1945 until 1965
Kenneth Blaxter, Director from 1965 until 1982.
Asim K. Duttaroy, Professor at the institute from 1990 to 2001, currently Professor of clinical nutrition at the University of Oslo.
Richard Laurence Millington Synge, researcher at the institute from 1948 to 1967, recipient of a Nobel Prize in Chemistry for the invention of partition chromatography.

References

External links
 The Rowett Institute
 Celebrating 100 years of the Rowett

Agricultural research institutes in the United Kingdom
Animal nutrition organizations
Animal research institutes
Educational institutions established in 1913
Food science institutes
Nutritional science organizations
Medical and health organisations based in Scotland
Organisations based in Aberdeen
Research institutes in Scotland
1913 establishments in Scotland
Science and technology in Aberdeen
University of Aberdeen